In numerical analysis, the Weierstrass method or Durand–Kerner method, discovered by Karl Weierstrass in 1891 and rediscovered independently by Durand in 1960 and Kerner in 1966, is a root-finding algorithm for solving polynomial equations. In other words, the method can be used to solve numerically the equation

 f(x) = 0,

where f is a given polynomial, which can be taken to be scaled so that the leading coefficient is 1.

Explanation
This explanation considers equations of degree four. It is easily generalized to other degrees.

Let the polynomial f be defined by

 

for all x.

The known numbers a, b, c, d are the coefficients.

Let the (potentially complex) numbers P, Q, R, S be the roots of this polynomial f.

Then

 

for all x. One can isolate the value P from this equation:

 

So if used as a fixed-point iteration
 
it is strongly stable in that every initial point x0 ≠ Q, R, S
delivers after one iteration the root P = x1.

Furthermore, if one replaces the zeros Q, R and S
by approximations q ≈ Q, r ≈ R,  s ≈ S,
such that q, r, s are not equal to P, then P
is still a fixed point of the perturbed fixed-point iteration

 
since

 

Note that the denominator is still different from zero.
This fixed-point iteration is a contraction mapping
for x around P.

The clue to the method now is to combine
the fixed-point iteration for P with similar iterations
for Q, R, S into a simultaneous iteration for all roots.

Initialize p, q, r, s:

 p0 := (0.4 + 0.9i)0,
 q0 := (0.4 + 0.9i)1,
 r0 := (0.4 + 0.9i)2,
 s0 := (0.4 + 0.9i)3.

There is nothing special about choosing 0.4 + 0.9i except that it is neither a real number nor a root of unity.

Make the substitutions for n = 1, 2, 3, ...:
 
 
 
 

Re-iterate until the numbers p, q, r, s
essentially stop changing relative to the desired precision.
They then have the values P, Q, R, S in some order
and in the chosen precision. So the problem is solved.

Note that complex number arithmetic must be used,
and that the roots are found simultaneously rather than one at a time.

Variations 
This iteration procedure, like the Gauss–Seidel method for linear equations,
computes one number at a time based on the already computed numbers.
A variant of this procedure, like the Jacobi method,
computes a vector of root approximations at a time.
Both variant are effective root-finding algorithms.

One could also choose the initial values for p, q, r, s
by some other procedure, even randomly, but in a way that 
 they are inside some not-too-large circle containing also the roots of f(x), e.g. the circle around the origin with radius , (where 1, a, b, c, d are the coefficients of f(x)) 
and that
 they are not too close to each other,
which may increasingly become a concern
as the degree of the polynomial increases.

If the coefficients are real and the polynomial has odd degree, then it must have at least one real root. To find this, use a real value of p0 as the initial guess and make q0 and r0, etc., complex conjugate pairs. Then the iteration will preserve these properties; that is, pn will always be real, and qn and rn, etc., will always be conjugate. In this way, the pn will converge to a real root P. Alternatively, make all of the initial guesses real; they will remain so.

Example 
This example is from the reference 1992. The first 4 iterations move p, q, r seemingly chaotically, but then the roots are located to 1 decimal. After iteration number 5 we have 4 correct decimals, and the subsequent iteration number 6 confirms that the computed roots are fixed. This general behaviour is characteristic for the method. Also notice that, in this example, the roots are used as soon as they are computed in each iteration. In other words, the computation of each second column uses the value of the previous computed columns.

{|class="wikitable"
|----
!it.-no.
!p
!q
!r
|----
!0
| +1.0000 + 0.0000i
| +0.4000 + 0.9000i
| −0.6500 + 0.7200i
|----
!1
| +1.3608 + 2.0222i
| −0.3658 + 2.4838i
| −2.3858 − 0.0284i
|----
!2
| +2.6597 + 2.7137i
| +0.5977 + 0.8225i
| −0.6320−1.6716i
|----
! 3
| +2.2704 + 0.3880i
| +0.1312 + 1.3128i
| +0.2821 − 1.5015i
|----
! 4  
| +2.5428 − 0.0153i
| +0.2044 + 1.3716i
| +0.2056 − 1.3721i
|----
! 5  
| +2.5874 + 0.0000i
| +0.2063 + 1.3747i
| +0.2063 − 1.3747i
|----
! 6  
| +2.5874 + 0.0000i
| +0.2063 + 1.3747i
| +0.2063 − 1.3747i
|----
|}
Note that the equation has one real root and one pair of complex conjugate roots, and that the sum of the roots is 3.

Derivation of the method via Newton's method

For every n-tuple of complex numbers, there is exactly one monic polynomial of degree n that has them as its zeros (keeping multiplicities). This polynomial is given by multiplying all the corresponding linear factors, that is

This polynomial has coefficients that depend on the prescribed zeros,

Those coefficients are, up to a sign, the elementary symmetric polynomials  of degrees 1,...,n.

To find all the roots of a given polynomial  with coefficient vector  simultaneously is now the same as to find a solution vector to the Vieta's system 

The Durand–Kerner method is obtained as the multidimensional Newton's method applied to this system. It is algebraically more comfortable to treat those identities of coefficients as the identity of the corresponding polynomials, . In the Newton's method one looks, given some initial vector , for an increment vector  such that  is satisfied up to second and higher order terms in the increment. For this one solves the identity

If the numbers  are pairwise different, then the polynomials in the terms of the right hand side form a basis of the n-dimensional space  of polynomials with maximal degree n − 1. Thus a solution  to the increment equation exists in this case. The coordinates of the increment  are simply obtained by evaluating the increment equation

at the points , which results in

, that is

Root inclusion via Gerschgorin's circles

In the quotient ring (algebra) of residue classes modulo ƒ(X), the multiplication by X defines an endomorphism that has the zeros of ƒ(X) as eigenvalues with the corresponding multiplicities. Choosing a basis, the multiplication operator is represented by its coefficient matrix A, the companion matrix of ƒ(X) for this basis.

Since every polynomial can be reduced modulo ƒ(X) to a polynomial of degree n − 1 or lower, the space of residue classes can be identified with the space of polynomials of degree bounded by n − 1. 
A problem specific basis can be taken from Lagrange interpolation as the set of n polynomials

where  are pairwise different complex numbers.

For the multiplication operator applied to the basis polynomials one obtains from the Lagrange interpolation

where  are again the Weierstrass updates.

The companion matrix of ƒ(X) is therefore
 

From the transposed matrix case of the Gershgorin circle theorem it follows that all eigenvalues of A, that is, all roots of ƒ(X), are contained in the union of the disks  with a radius .

Here one has , so the centers are the next iterates of the Weierstrass iteration, and radii  that are multiples of the Weierstrass updates. If the roots of ƒ(X) are all well isolated (relative to the computational precision) and the points  are sufficiently close approximations to these roots, then all the disks will become disjoint, so each one contains exactly one zero. The midpoints of the circles will be better approximations of the zeros.

Every conjugate matrix  of A is as well a companion matrix of ƒ(X). Choosing T as diagonal matrix leaves the structure of A invariant. Petkovic et al. 1995).

Convergence results

So after the approximation is close, Newton's method converges quadratically; that is, the error is squared with every step (which will greatly reduce the error once it is less than 1). In the case of the Durand–Kerner method, convergence is quadratic if the vector  is close to some permutation of the vector of the roots of f.

For the conclusion of linear convergence there is a more specific result (see ref. Petkovic et al. 1995). If the initial vector  and its vector of Weierstrass updates  satisfies the inequality

 

then this inequality also holds for all iterates, all inclusion disks 
are disjoint, and linear convergence with a contraction factor of 1/2 holds. Further, the inclusion disks can in this case be chosen as

 

each containing exactly one zero of f.

Failing general convergence

The Weierstrass / Durand-Kerner method is not generally convergent: in other words, it is not true that for every polynomial, the set of initial vectors that eventually converges to roots is open and dense. In fact, there are open sets of polynomials that have open sets of initial vectors that converge to periodic cycles other than roots (see Reinke et al.)

References

 
 
 
 
 
  Bo Jacoby, Nulpunkter for polynomier, CAE-nyt (a periodical for Dansk CAE Gruppe [Danish CAE Group]), 1988.
  Agnethe Knudsen, Numeriske Metoder (lecture notes), Københavns Teknikum.
  Bo Jacoby, Numerisk løsning af ligninger, Bygningsstatiske meddelelser (Published by Danish Society for Structural Science and Engineering) volume 63 no. 3–4, 1992, pp. 83–105.
 
 Victor Pan (May 2002): Univariate Polynomial Root-Finding with Lower Computational Precision and Higher Convergence Rates. Tech-Report, City University of New York
 
 Jan Verschelde, The method of Weierstrass (also known as the Durand–Kerner method), 2003.
 Bernhard Reinke, Dierk Schleicher, and Michael Stoll, ``The Weierstrass root finder is not generally convergent, 2020

External links
 Ada Generic_Roots using the Durand–Kerner Method (archive) — an open-source implementation in Ada
 Polynomial Roots — an open-source implementation in Java
 Roots Extraction from Polynomials : The Durand–Kerner Method'' — contains a Java applet demonstration

Root-finding algorithms